Otho Addison "Doc" Gorman (July 23, 1893 – September 22, 1938) was a professional football player during the early 1920s. He played in the National Football League, in 1921 and 1922, for the Evansville Crimson Giants. Gorman also played halfback at the college level for St. Louis University.

Gorman also played football in 1920 with the semi-pro Evansville Ex-Collegians. When Frank Fausch established his Crimson Giants in 1921, many of the Ex-Collegians, including Gorman, stayed loyal to Ex-Collegians manager Menz Lindsey. However once Fausch gained the only lease to Bosse Field, the city's only football field, Gorman became the first Ex-Collegians, outside of Fausch and Mark Ingle, to join the team.

Outside of pro football, Gorman worked as a dentist.

References

1893 births
1938 deaths
American dentists
Evansville Crimson Giants players
Evansville Ex-Collegians players
Saint Louis Billikens football players
Players of American football from Illinois
People from Sangamon County, Illinois
20th-century dentists